The Great Highway is a road in San Francisco that forms the city's western edge along the Pacific coast. Built in 1929, it runs for approximately  next to Ocean Beach. Its southern end is at Skyline Boulevard (State Route 35) near Lake Merced; it extends to Point Lobos Avenue and the Cliff House at its northern end. In 2020 a portion of the road was closed to vehicular traffic, opening back to traffic in 2021 during weekdays.

Description 

The Great Highway starts at Skyline Boulevard and runs north to Point Lobos Avenue and the Cliff House in the Outer Richmond neighborhood of San Francisco. It forms the western border of Golden Gate Park with two windmills, the Dutch Windmill and the Murphy Windmill at the northwestern and southwestern corners of the park along the highway. Both windmills were built to pump water into Golden Gate Park.

As a north–south throughway, this section of the highway does not provide access to destinations in the nearby Sunset neighborhood, other than Lincoln Way and Sloat Boulevard. It is a recreational street with no car-usable turn-offs in the two miles between Lincoln and Sloat. This provides limited use for local traffic, so a parallel street named Lower Great Highway is immediately adjacent to the east of the recreational street. This street has residential dwellings on one side and a mixed use trail running parallel between the two streets. It is adorned with stop signs and speed bumps on nearly every block.

The N Judah, a San Francisco Municipal Railway streetcar line, ends at Great Highway and Judah, while the L Taraval, another streetcar line, ends two blocks from Great Highway at Wawona and 46th Avenue.

History 
The Great Highway was laid out in the Humphreys-Potter map of 1868 which laid out the streets of San Francisco’s newly acquired Outside Lands, including the Richmond and Sunset districts.

In the 1890s, a railway line was run along the route of the Great Highway from its Southern terminus to Golden Gate Park in order to build the California Midwinter International Exposition of 1894. Although these tracks were removed in February 1895, the berm that supported them is still visible on the East side of the Great Highway today, supporting a multi-use pathway.

In the early 1900s, as the automobile gained popularity, efforts were made to improve and widen the Great Highway as well as protect it from erosion. City engineer Michael O'Shaughnessy’s Ocean Beach Esplanade was completed in 1928, along with a newly paved Great Highway in 1929. The concrete seawall survives to this day.

During the Hot Rod era of the 1950s-60s, the Great Highway was a popular destination for owners of modified cars and others who wished to engage in rolling drag races. In the 1980s, San Francisco converted the highway from eight lanes to four lanes with an underwater stormwater transport box to adhere to the California Coastal Act and Clean Water Act.

Due to rising sea levels the southernmost portion of the highway, Great Highway Extension from Sloat Boulevard to California State Route 35, is slated to close to vehicle traffic permanently starting in 2023 as part of the Ocean Beach Climate Change Adaptation Project, to be replaced with a multi-use pathway and seawall protections for city wastewater infrastructure.

2020 closure, reopening, and pilot program 
In April 2020, the two mile segment (55%) of the Great Highway between Lincoln and Sloat was closed to motorized vehicles, causing some people to refer to the new pedestrian-only segment as the "Great Walkway". City officials claim that the closure attracted an average of 26,400 weekly pedestrian and bike visitors, versus 140,000 vehicles per week passing through when it was open to motorized traffic. 

One city survey of 4,000 San Francisco residents found 53% of respondents supported making the closure to motor vehicles permanent. A community created petition got over 11,000 signatures to reopen the highway to cars as of August 2021. Prior to the motor vehicle closure, the roadway was closed an average of 27 times a year for sand removal and flooding. In April 2022, the Great Highway was partially or completely closed to motor vehicles for the entire month.

In August 2021, three westside San Francisco supervisors and Mayor London Breed announced a new operational plan for the Great Highway. The plan opened the Great Highway to motor vehicle traffic on weekdays, while keeping it as a park on weekends and holidays. This announcement short-circuited a separate and ongoing planning process by the San Francisco County Transportation Authority to plan for the long-term future of the space, causing some protests. In December 2022, the San Francisco Board of Supervisors voted 9-2 to keep the Great Highway car-free on weekends, holidays, and Friday afternoons until 2025.

See also
49-Mile Scenic Drive
Ocean Beach Public Policy

References

Streets in San Francisco
Sunset District, San Francisco
Transport infrastructure completed in 1929